Panjanathikottai is a village in the Orathanadu taluk of Thanjavur district, Tamil Nadu, India.

Demographics 

As per the 2001 census, Panjanathikottai had a total population of 2244 with 1151 males and 1093 females. The sex ratio was 950. The literacy rate was 65.62.

References 

 

Villages in Thanjavur district